"Phakade Lami" is a single by South African singer Nomfundo Moh featuring Zimbabwean-born Sha Sha and South African singer Ami Faku, released on October 11, 2021 by Universal, as album's third single from her debut studio album Amagama (2022). It was produced by Celimpilo Manyathi,
Martin Manqoba Sosibo, Charmaine Mapimbiro.

The song was certified 4× platinum in South Africa.

Background 
She revealed release date via her Twitter account on October 8, 2021.

Commercial performance 
Upon its release the song garnered over 3 000 000 streams on Spotify.
 
"Phakade Lami" was certified 4× platinum in South Africa.

Certifications and sales

Personnel  
All credits adapted from AllMusic.
 Amanda Faku - Composer
 Ami Faku - Featured Artist, Primary Artist
 Celimpilo Manyathi - Producer
 Charmaine Mapimbiro - Composer, Producer
 Nomfundo Moh - Composer, Primary Artist
 Sha Sha - Featured Artist, Primary Artist
 Martin Manqoba Sosibo - Producer

Accolades 
"Phakade Lami" received several nominations at 28th South African Music Awards  was nominated for Record of the Year, Music Video of the Year, and TikTok Viral Song of the Year. At the 2022 Basadi in Music Awards received a nomination for Song of the Year.

!  
|-
|rowspan="3"|2022 
|rowspan="3" style="text-align:center;" | "Phakade Lami"
|Record of the Year 
|
| rowspan= "2"|
|-
|Music Video of the Year 
|
|-
|TikTok Viral Song of the Year
|
|
|-
|2022
|rowspan="2"|"Phakade Lami"
|Song of the Year 
|
|
|-
|2022
|Best Artist, Duo or Group in African RnB & Soul
|
|

References 

2021 songs
Universal Records singles